Calliotropis francocacii is a species of sea snail, a marine gastropod mollusk in the family Eucyclidae.

Description
The size of the shell varies 5.7 mm and 6.3 mm.

Distribution
This marine species occurs off the Philippines.

References

External links
 

francocacii
Gastropods described in 2006